Qavamabad or Qavvamabad or Qawwamabad or Quvvamabad may refer to:
 Qavamabad, Kharameh, Fars Province
 Qavamabad, Pasargad, Fars Province
 Qavamabad-e Chichaklu, Fars Province
 Qavamabad, Isfahan
 Qavamabad, Kerman
 Qavamabad, Rafsanjan, Kerman Province
 Qavamabad, Yazd